Estadio de la UNSA (official name) is a multi-purpose stadium located in Arequipa, Peru. The stadium was built by the University of San Agustín in the early 1990s and named after the Virgin Chapi. Due to its size, the term Monumental is added to its name. The stadium was largely financed by a lottery fund-raiser held by the university itself. The stadium has hosted large events such as the Bolivarian Games and the Copa América in addition to a Copa Sudamericana final in 2003 involving Cienciano and River Plate. The stadium's allowed spectator capacity is currently 60,000.

History
On 2 February 1985, Pope John Paul II visited the city of Arequipa in which the coronation of the Virgin of Chapi took place on a field. The field would eventually become the site of the monumental stadium the University of San Agustín would build. Early efforts to gather funds were largely organized by the university, which organized several fund-raisers by giving volunteering students lottery tickets to sell throughout the city. The prizes consisted of apartments near the new stadium. The rector of university Juan Manuel Guillén said that 70% of the stadium was financed through this lottery fund-raiser. Former president Alberto Fujimori promised to donate $2.5 million for the construction of the stadium; however the project only received S./ 2.5 million from the former president which he received severe criticism for.

The stadium was first opened on 11 November 1993. The first game to be played was an inter-schools championship final between Ingeniería Geofísica and Mecánica Eléctrica; Ingeniería Geofísica won 1–0. On 30 July 1995, the first professional football match was played in which local FBC Melgar faced Alianza Lima; the match ended in a 1–1 draw. In 1997, the stadium hosted the XIII Bolivarian Games. Nevertheless, the most important match ever to be hosted by the Virgen de Chapi stadium was the second leg of the 2003 Copa Sudamericana Finals between local Cienciano of Cusco and Argentinian River Plate. Cienciano's home ground in Cusco did not meet the stadium requirements for CONMEBOL competition finals and thus played in Arequipa's 40,000-seater stadium. The turnout for the match was unprecedented and Cienciano defeated River Plate 1–0 (after a 3–3 draw in Buenos Aires) to lift Peru's first international club trophy. In addition to the Sudamericana final, Cienciano continued to play in Arequipa for international matches until their own Estadio Garcilaso de la Vega was renovated.

The stadium was selected to be a venue for the 2004 Copa América. Arequipa hosted the first four group matches of Group C involving the national football teams of Costa Rica, Brazil, Paraguay, and Chile.

The stadium will be one of the five venues for the 2019 FIFA U-17 World Cup.

See also
 Peru national football team
 List of Peruvian Stadiums

References

External links
 Peruvian Soccer Federation (in Spanish)

Estadio Monumental Virgen de Chapi
Football venues in Peru
Copa América stadiums
Sports venues completed in 1993
1993 establishments in Peru
Estadio Monumental Virgen de Chapi